Carson Fordham Wells Jr. (May 13, 1880 – August 30, 1956) was an American architect who designed buildings in the state of Utah, including the NRHP-listed Kanab Library.

Works include (probably, some yet to be confirmed):
Box Elder County Courthouse, 1 N. Main St. Brigham City, UT (Wells, Carson), NRHP-listed9
Brigham City Fire Station/City Hall, 6 N. Main St. Brigham City, UT (Wells, Carson F.), NRHP-listed
Kanab Library, 600 South 100 E. Kanab, UT (Wells, Carson F. Jr.), NRHP-listed
Howard Hotel (1914 remodelling of 1903 building), 35 S. Main St. Brigham City, UT (Wells, C. F.), NRHP-listed

References

1880 births
1956 deaths
Utah State University alumni
Architects from Utah
20th-century American architects